Mikateko Golden Mahlaule is a South African politician from Limpopo who serves as a Member of Parliament (MP) for the African National Congress.

Parliamentary career
Mahlaule is a member of the African National Congress. Prior to the 8 May 2019 general election, Mahlaule was placed 107th on the party's national list. After the election, he was selected to go to Parliament. He was sworn in as a Member of the National Assembly of South Africa on 22 May 2019.

Mahlaule became a member of the Portfolio Committee on Mineral Resources and Energy on 27 June 2019.

On 21 June 2021, Mahlaule became a member of the Committee for Section 194 Enquiry which will determine if Advocate Busisiwe Mkhwebane should be removed as Public Protector.

References

External links
Mikateko Golden Mahlaule at Parliament of South Africa

Living people
Year of birth missing (living people)
People from Limpopo
African National Congress politicians
Members of the National Assembly of South Africa